The West Hartford Reservoir recreation area is located on the western edge of West Hartford, Connecticut and  northeast of Farmington, Connecticut. There are six large reservoirs along the eastern part of the park and a paved cycling trail that winds through the southern portion. The blue-blazed Metacomet Trail follows the highest ridge of the area and the network of trails throughout the area has led this to be a local mecca for mountain bikers, hikers, and trail-runners. The Deer Cliff ledges have a long tradition of climbing routes for local mountaineers, but at this time the private access to the cliff base has been closed to the public. The Revolutionary War Campsite historical site is located near reservoir #6.

The property is owned by the Metropolitan District (The MDC), a non-profit municipal corporation chartered by the Connecticut General Assembly in 1929 to provide water and sewer services to the Hartford region.

In 2010 Travel and Leisure magazine described the Reservoir as "West Hartford’s version of Central Park” with nearly 30 miles of trail.

Gallery

References

External links 
 West Hartford Reservoir Trail Map

West Hartford, Connecticut
Climbing areas of the United States
Hiking trails in Connecticut
Protected areas of Hartford County, Connecticut
Lakes of Hartford County, Connecticut
Reservoirs in Connecticut